George Pillsbury may refer to:
 George A. Pillsbury (1816–1898), businessman and miller associated with the formation of the Pillsbury Company
 George S. Pillsbury (1921–2012), American businessman and politician